Stade Ben M'Hamed El Abdi is a multi-use stadium in El Jadida, Morocco.  It is currently used mostly for football matches and hosts the home games of Difaa El Jadida. The stadium holds 8,000 people. It was named in honor of Ben M’Hamed El Abdi, the greatest player of Difaa El Jadida

External links
Stade El-Abdi profile - Soccerway.com

Football venues in Morocco
Difaâ Hassani El Jadidi
Buildings and structures in Casablanca-Settat